Smith & Caughey Ltd, trading as Smith & Caughey's, is a chain of two mid-sized, upscale department stores in Auckland, New Zealand.

 

One of the oldest surviving retail businesses in New Zealand, it was established in 1880 by Ulster-born Marianne Smith as a drapers and millinery shop, and is the oldest-surviving department store in Auckland. Currently, it is mostly fashion-oriented, with sections for jewellery, make-up and homewares.

Stores
The company has two stores in Auckland; on Queen Street, City Centre, and on Broadway, Newmarket. The flagship Queen Street store occupies a Heritage New Zealand Category 1 Listed building, which was designed by American architect Roy Alstan Lippincott and completed in 1929. The smaller Newmarket store occupies a building which was built by the company in the 1880s; the Newmarket branch initially operated under the name of Hugh Gilmore, before reverting to Smith and Caughey in 1917.

The current official ambassador for Smith & Caughey's is New Zealand actress Antonia Prebble.

Gallery

See also
Kirkcaldie & Stains
Ballantynes
Arthur Barnett
H & J Smith
Farmers
Milne & Choyce

References

External links
Smith & Caughey's official website 
Smith & Caughey's official Facebook page

Retail companies established in 1880
Department stores of New Zealand
Companies based in Auckland
Auckland CBD